Princess Henriette of Belgium (30 November 1870 – 28 March 1948), was the daughter of Prince Philippe, Count of Flanders, and Princess Marie of Hohenzollern. She was the younger twin sister of Princess Joséphine Marie of Belgium, who died at the age of six weeks in 1871.

Marriage and family

She married in Brussels, Belgium, on 12 February 1896 Prince Emmanuel d'Orléans (18 January 1872 – 1 February 1931). He was a son of Prince Ferdinand, Duke of Alençon, and Duchess Sophie Charlotte in Bavaria, and was a great-grandson of King Louis Philippe I of France.

The couple had four children:

 Princess Marie Louise of Orléans (31 December 1896 – 8 March 1973); she married Prince Philip of Bourbon-Two Sicilies on 12 January 1916 and they were divorced in 1925. They have one son. She remarried to Walter Kingsland on 12 December 1928 
 Princess Sophie Joséphine Louise Marie Immaculée Gabrielle Philippine Henriette of Orléans (19 October 1898–9 October 1928); she was suggested to marry King Alexander I of Yugoslavia, but as soon as he discovered that she was mentally disabled, all plans were dropped off.
 Princess Geneviève Marie Jeanne Françoise Chantal Monique Louise Alberte Joséphine Gabrielle Emmanuelle Henriette of Orléans (21 September 1901–22 August 1983); she married Antoine Marie François de Chaponay, Marquis de Chaponay-Morance on 2 July 1923. They have two children: 
 Henryane de Chaponay-Morance (8 May 1924-9 October 2019)
 Pierre de Chaponay-Morance (24 January 1925-2 October 1943); he died at the age of eighteen during World War II. 
 Prince Charles Philippe, Duke of Nemours (4 April 1905–10 March 1970) he married Marguerite Watson (12 February 1899-27 Dec 1993) on 24 September 1928.

Life
Henriette was a great sportswoman, and was often considered the best shot among royal women. On one occasion, she killed a stag that had already killed another, making her very popular in Belgian sporting circles. She even earned the sobriquet the "Sporting Duchess". In 1908, she accompanied her husband to the Rocky Mountains in the United States to shoot grizzly bears.

She often did royal visits for her brother King Albert. In 1914 for instance, she visited a hospital in Neuilly that was treating American troops. In two letters, Henriette and her sister-in-law Queen Elisabeth expressed their appreciation and asked for more support from the American Commission For Relief in Belgium, which had been giving donations to the Belgian people ever since the German invasion.

Henriette Marie of Belgium died aged 77, on 28 March 1948, in Sierre, Valais, Switzerland.

Honours 
  : Dame of the Order of Saint Elizabeth, 1900: Wedding Gift in honour of her brother.

Ancestry

References

1870 births
1948 deaths
Belgian princesses
Princesses of France (Orléans)
19th-century Belgian people
20th-century Belgian people
Belgian twins
Duchesses of Vendôme
Princesses of Saxe-Coburg and Gotha
Nobility from Brussels
Burials at the Chapelle royale de Dreux
House of Saxe-Coburg and Gotha (Belgium)